The 1956 National Football League draft had its first three rounds held on November 28, 1955, at the Bellevue-Stratford Hotel in Philadelphia, Pennsylvania, and its final twenty-seven rounds on January 17–18, 1956, at the Ambassador Hotel in Los Angeles, California

The previous NFL drafts in the 1950s were held in January; the first three rounds (37 selections) were moved up this year to late November to better compete with teams 

This was the tenth year that the first overall pick was a bonus pick determined by lottery. With the previous nine winners ineligible from the draw, only the Chicago Cardinals, Green Bay Packers, and Pittsburgh Steelers had an equal chance of winning. The draft lottery was won by Pittsburgh, who selected defensive back Gary Glick.

Player selections

Round one

Round two

Round three

Round four

Round five

Round six

Round seven

Round eight

Round nine

Round ten

Round eleven

Round twelve

Round thirteen

Round fourteen

Round fifteen

Round sixteen

Round seventeen

Round eighteen

Round nineteen

Round twenty

Round twenty-one

Round twenty-two

Round twenty-three

Round twenty-four

Round twenty-five

Round twenty-six

Round twenty-seven

Round twenty-eight

Round twenty-nine

Round thirty

Hall of Famers 
 Lenny Moore, halfback from Penn State taken 1st round 9th overall by the Baltimore Colts.
Inducted: Professional Football Hall of Fame class of 1975.
 Forrest Gregg, offensive tackle from Southern Methodist University taken 2nd round 20th overall by the Green Bay Packers.
Inducted: Professional Football Hall of Fame class of 1977.
 Bart Starr, quarterback from University of Alabama taken 17th round 200th overall by the Green Bay Packers.
Inducted: Professional Football Hall of Fame class of 1977.
 Willie Davis, defensive end from Grambling State University taken 15th round 181st overall by the Cleveland Browns.
Inducted: Professional Football Hall of Fame class of 1981.
 Sam Huff, linebacker from West Virginia taken 3rd round 30th overall by the New York Giants.
Inducted: Professional Football Hall of Fame class of 1982.

Notable undrafted players

References

External links 
 NFL.com – 1956 Draft
 databaseFootball.com – 1956 Draft
 Pro Football Hall of Fame

National Football League Draft
Draft
NFL Draft
NFL Draft
NFL Draft
NFL Draft
American football in Philadelphia
1950s in Philadelphia
Events in Philadelphia
1956 in Los Angeles
American football in Los Angeles
Events in Los Angeles